Covered Wagon Raid is a 1950 American Western film directed by R. G. Springsteen and written by M. Coates Webster. The film stars Allan Lane, Eddy Waller, Alex Gerry, Lyn Thomas, Byron Barr and Dick Curtis. The film was released on June 30, 1950, by Republic Pictures.

Plot
A prospective settler, pioneer Bob Davis, is gunned down by hired guns Grif and Brag, who work for saloonkeeper and prospective land baron Harvey "Deacon" Grimes. The killing is witnessed by insurance investigator Rocky Lane, who decides to go undercover and help the dead man's daughter, Susie.

Rancher's daughter Gail Warren gets acquainted with Rocky, but inadvertently reveals his true identity to Grimes and his men. Rocky is able to prevail, however, and leaves town, promising to come back.

Cast
Allan Lane as Rocky Lane 
Eddy Waller as Nugget Clark
Alex Gerry as Deacon Harvey Grimes
Lyn Thomas as Gail Warren
Byron Barr as Roy Chandler
Dick Curtis as Henchman Grif
Pierce Lyden as Henchman Brag
Sherry Jackson as Susie Davis
Rex Lease as Bob Davis
Lester Dorr as Bartender Pete
Lee Roberts as Henchman Steve
Black Jack as Black Jack

References

External links 
 

1950 films
American Western (genre) films
1950 Western (genre) films
Republic Pictures films
Films directed by R. G. Springsteen
Films adapted into comics
American black-and-white films
1950s English-language films
1950s American films